The Tasmania Devils (also known as the Tassie Devils) is an Australian rules football club that competes in the NAB League Boys and NAB League Girls competitions. The team is made up of footballers based in Tasmania aged between 17 and 19 years of age, and competes against other representative teams based in metropolitan Melbourne and regional Victoria, as part of the Australian Football League's (AFL) talent pathway systems for male and female players.

History
The NAB League/TAC Cup competition has had a Tasmanian presence since 1995, when a team named the Tassie Mariners entered the boys league and competed until the end of the 2002 season. By the late 2000s Tasmania had returned to the boys competition as an "academy team" (which played only some matches against select Victorian teams and was not eligible for the league finals series or premiership), before graduating to full-time status in the 2019 season. The girls team began competing as an "academy team" in 2019 before becoming a full-time team in the 2021 season.

Home Grounds
The Devils split home matches between York Park in Launceston and Bellerive Oval in Hobart.

Honours

Boys

Premierships (0): Nil
Runners-up (0): Nil
Minor Premierships (0): Nil 
Wooden Spoons (0): Nil

Girls

Premierships (0): Nil
Runners-up (0): Nil
Minor Premierships (0): Nil 
Wooden Spoons (0): Nil

See also
 Tasmania AFL bid
 Tasmania Devils (VFL)
 Tassie Mariners

References

External links
 Tasmania Devils official webpage
 Tasmania Devils page at AFL.com.au
 Tasmania Devils Twitter page

NAB League clubs
2019 establishments in Australia
Australian rules football clubs in Tasmania
NAB League Girls clubs
Sport in Hobart
Australian rules football clubs established in 2019
Sport in Launceston, Tasmania